Atractomorpha may refer to:
 Atractomorpha (alga), an algae genus in the family Sphaeropleaceae
 Atractomorpha (grasshopper), a grasshopper genus in the family Pyrgomorphidae